V. Sivapunniam is an Indian politician and former Member of the Legislative Assembly of Tamil Nadu. He was elected to the Tamil Nadu legislative assembly as a Communist Party of India candidate from Mannargudi constituency in 1996, 2001 and 2006 elections.

References 

Communist Party of India politicians from Tamil Nadu
Living people
Tamil Nadu MLAs 1996–2001
Tamil Nadu MLAs 2001–2006
Tamil Nadu MLAs 2006–2011
Year of birth missing (living people)